Peter Gene Hernandez (born October 8, 1985), known professionally as Bruno Mars, is an American singer, songwriter, and record producer. He is known for his stage performances, retro showmanship, and for performing in a wide range of musical styles, including pop, R&B, funk, soul, reggae, disco, and rock. Mars is accompanied by his band, the Hooligans, who play a variety of instruments, such as electric guitar, bass, piano, keyboards, drums, and horns, and also serve as backup singers and dancers.

Born and raised in Honolulu, Hawaii, Mars moved to Los Angeles in 2003 to pursue a musical career. In 2009, he co-founded the production team The Smeezingtons, responsible for various successful singles for Mars himself and other artists. He rose to fame in 2010 buoyed by the success of "Nothin' on You" by B.o.B and "Billionaire" by Travie McCoy, both of which featured his vocals. That year, Mars released his debut studio album Doo-Wops & Hooligans, which blended pop with reggae and R&B. It spawned the international number-one singles "Just the Way You Are", "Grenade", and "The Lazy Song". Drawing inspiration from disco, funk, rock, reggae and soul genres, his second studio album, Unorthodox Jukebox (2012), was his first number one on the Billboard 200. It amassed two Billboard Hot 100 number-one songs, "Locked Out of Heaven" and "When I Was Your Man".

In 2014, Mars was featured on Mark Ronson's "Uptown Funk", which topped various music charts, spending a total of fourteen and seven weeks atop the Billboard Hot 100 and the UK Singles Chart, respectively. Mars's third studio album, the R&B-focused 24K Magic (2016), received seven Grammy Awards, winning the major categories of Album of the Year, Record of the Year, and Song of the Year. The album also yielded the top-five singles "24K Magic", "That's What I Like" (his seventh Billboard Hot 100 number-one single), and a remix of "Finesse" featuring Cardi B. In 2021, Mars and Anderson .Paak, as Silk Sonic, released the collaborative studio album An Evening with Silk Sonic, which delved into 1970s R&B and soul and was led by the chart-topping single "Leave the Door Open". It received four Grammy Awards, including Record of the Year and Song of the Year.

Mars has sold over 130 million records worldwide, making him one of the best-selling music artists of all time. Eight of his songs have reached number one on the Billboard Hot 100 and his concert tours are some of the highest-grossing in history. He has received 15 Grammy Awards (including three  Record of the Year wins), four Brit Awards, eleven American Music Awards, 13 Soul Train Awards and holds three Guinness World Records, among other accolades. He featured on Music Weeks best songwriters (2011) and Billboards Greatest of All Time Artists (2019) lists and rankings such as the Time 100 and Forbes Celebrity 100. Mars became the first artist to receive six Diamond-certified songs in the United States and has been regarded as a pop icon due to his influential career.

Life and career

1985–2003: Early life and musical beginnings
Peter Gene Hernandez was born on October 8, 1985, in Honolulu, Hawaii, to Peter Hernandez and Bernadette San Pedro Bayot, and was raised in the Waikiki neighborhood of Honolulu. His father is of half Puerto Rican and half Jewish descent, and is originally from Brooklyn, New York. Mars has stated that his Jewish ancestors were from Hungary and Ukraine. His mother emigrated from the Philippines to Hawaii, and was of Filipino and Spanish ancestry. His parents met while performing in a show in which his mother was a Hula dancer and his father played percussion. At the age of two, he was nicknamed "Bruno" by his father because of his resemblance to professional wrestler Bruno Sammartino.

Mars is one of six children and came from a musical family which exposed him to a diverse mix of music genres, including first and foremost rock and roll, and later reggae, hip hop, and rhythm and blues. His mother was both a singer and a dancer, and his father performed Little Richard's music, which inspired him as a young child. His uncle was an Elvis Presley impersonator, and also encouraged three-year-old Mars to perform songs on stage by Presley and Michael Jackson. At the age of four, Mars began performing five days a week with his family's band, The Love Notes, and became known in Hawaii for his impersonation of Elvis Presley. When he was five he urinated on himself during a performance of Presley's "Can't Help Falling in Love" (1961), which led his parents to think they could be making a mistake. However, Mars never wavered. In 1990, Mars was featured in the Hawaiian tabloid shopper MidWeek as "Little Elvis" and performed in the halftime show of the 1990 Aloha Bowl.

In 1992, he appeared in a cameo role in the film Honeymoon in Vegas and was interviewed by Pauly Shore on MTV. When Mars was six years old, he was featured on The Arsenio Hall Show and throughout grade school, he performed with his family's band, two shows a night, covering Frankie Lymon and Little Anthony. When he was a child he had a small version of a drum set, guitar, piano, and some percussion and learned to play the instruments. When Mars was 12, his parents divorced, ending The Love Notes act. His father's various businesses, ranging from temporary-tattoo parlors to memorabilia shops, failed. Consequently, there was no longer a steady source of income. He moved out of his parents' house along with his brother and father. They lived in the "slums of Hawaii", on the back of a car, on rooftops, and in an abandoned bird zoo, Paradise Park, where his father worked before it closed. Mars transferred schools and was bullied initially, but he became popular in his last school days.

The time Mars spent impersonating Presley had a major impact on his musical evolution and performing techniques. He later began playing guitar after being inspired by American rock guitarist Jimi Hendrix. In 2010, he also acknowledged his Hawaiian roots and musical family as an influence, explaining: "Growing up in Hawaii made me the man I am. I used to do a lot of shows in Hawaii with my father's band. Everybody in my family sings, everyone plays instruments ... I've just been surrounded by it." When he attended President Theodore Roosevelt High School in Honolulu he sang in a group called The School Boys, who did several shows including opening for his father's new band, performing songs by the Isley Brothers and the Temptations. The singer, while in high school, became well known in Hawaiian entertainment, becoming the opening gig for a huge magic show and impersonating Michael Jackson in a celebrity-impersonators show, making $75 per performance.

After his sister in Los Angeles, California, played his demo for Mike Lynn (the head of A&R at Dr. Dre's Aftermath Entertainment record label), Lynn summoned Mars to Los Angeles. In 2003, shortly after graduating from high school at the age of 17, Mars moved to Los Angeles to pursue a musical career. At that time, he lived on Mansfield Avenue and was surprised by the poverty and squalor of the neighborhood. He adopted his stage name from the childhood nickname his father gave him, adding "Mars" at the end because: "I felt like I didn't have no pizzazz, and a lot of girls say I'm out of this world, so I was like I guess I'm from Mars." Moreover, the adoption of his stage name was also an effort to "avoid being stereotyped", as the music industry tried to pigeonhole him as another Latin artist. They even tried to convince Mars to sing in Spanish.

2004–2010: Production work and It's Better If You Don't Understand

Shortly after moving to Los Angeles, Mars signed a record contract with Motown Records in 2004, but the deal "went nowhere", leading him to have a conversation with will.i.am's management, which also turned out to be fruitless. However, the singer's experience with Motown proved to be beneficial to his career. American songwriter and record producer Philip Lawrence was also signed to the label.

After Mars was dropped by the label less than a year after being signed, he stayed in Los Angeles and landed a music publishing deal in 2005 with American record producers Steve Lindsey and Cameron Strang at Westside Independent.

Lindsey showed Mars and fellow songwriters Brody Brown and Jeff Bhasker (who Mars met through Mike Lynn) the ins and outs of writing pop music and acted as a mentor, helping them to hone their craft. Bhasker explained that Lindsey would "mentor us, and kind of give us lectures as to what a hit pop song is, because you can have talent and music ability, but understanding what makes a hit pop song is a whole other discipline." Lindsey confessed he "held Mars back for five years while they learned an extensive catalog of hit music." In a different interview, Brown corroborated the former story. During this time, Mars played cover songs around Los Angeles in a band called Sex Panther, with Bhasker and Eric Hernandez (the former's brother), who eventually became the drummer of The Hooligans.

When Lawrence was first told he should meet Mars he was reluctant to do so since he did not even have money for bus fare. Keith Harris, the drummer for the American musical group The Black Eyed Peas, told Lawrence: "Whatever it costs you to get out here, I'll reimburse you." Lawrence responded: "Just give me five dollars back for the bus." The pair began collaborating, writing songs for Mars, but they received many rejections from record labels. In 2006, Lawrence introduced Mars to his future A&R manager at Atlantic Records, Aaron Bay-Schuck. After hearing him play a couple of songs on the guitar, Bay-Schuck wanted to sign him immediately, but it took roughly three years for Atlantic Records to finally sign Mars to the label, because they felt it was too early and that he still needed to develop as an artist.

In 2008, on the verge of giving up, they received a call from Brandon Creed, who was looking for songs for a reunited Menudo. He liked their song "Lost", which was written for Mars. The duo did not want to give the song away, but when they were offered $20,000 for it, they agreed. The sale of this song allowed them to continue working, and Mars and Lawrence decided that they would write and produce songs together for other artists. Eventually, Creed became the former's manager for nine years.

Before becoming a successful solo artist, Mars was an acknowledged music producer, writing songs for the likes of Alexandra Burke, Adam Levine, Brandy, Sean Kingston, and Flo Rida. He also co-wrote the Sugababes' hit song "Get Sexy" (2009) and provided backing vocals on their album Sweet 7 (2010). In 2009, he was featured as a singer on Far East Movement's second studio album, Animal, on the track "3D". In the same year, he was also featured on American pastor and hip hop artist Jaeson Ma's debut single "Love" and on American rapper Travie McCoy's "One at a Time", a charity single for MTV's Staying Alive foundation. He reached prominence as a solo artist after being featured on, and composing (as part of the production group the Smeezingtons) American rapper B.o.B's "Nothin' on You" (2009) and McCoy's "Billionaire" (2010); both songs peaked within the top ten of various music charts, with the former charting at number one on both the United States Billboard Hot 100 and the UK Singles Chart.

Mars said of these successful singles: "I think those songs weren't meant to be full-sung songs. If I'd sung all of 'Nothin' on You', it might've sounded like some '90s R&B." On May 11, 2010, Mars released his debut extended play (EP), It's Better If You Don't Understand. It peaked at number 99 on the US Billboard 200 and a music video was released for the song "The Other Side" featuring American singer CeeLo Green and B.o.B. Mars, under the Smeezingtons, also composed Green's successful single "Fuck You" (2010).

2010–2012: Doo-Wops & Hooligans

On July 20, 2010, Mars released "Just the Way You Are" as the lead single from his debut studio album, Doo-Wops & Hooligans (2010), an album produced mainly by the Smeezingtons. The song topped the charts in various countries, including Australia, Canada and the U.S. The album, released on October 5, 2010, debuted at number three on the Billboard 200 and number one in the UK. It also charted at number one in the Netherlands and Canada. Doo-Wops & Hooligans has since sold 15.5 million copies worldwide. It spawned two other international singles, "Grenade", which topped the Billboard Hot 100, New Zealand, the UK, as well as multiple other charts, and "The Lazy Song", which peaked at number four on the Billboard Hot 100 and reached the top spot in the UK and Denmark.

Other singles include "Talking to the Moon", which was exclusively released in Brazil and topped Billboard Brasil's Hot Pop Songs and Hot 100 Airplay. "Marry You", which was only released to international markets, entering the top ten of various countries, and "Count On Me", which served as the final single in Australia. Mars released the single "It Will Rain" for The Twilight Saga: Breaking Dawn – Part 1 film soundtrack (2011). The song reached number three in the U.S. and at number two in New Zealand. During this period, Mars featured on "Lighters" with American hip hop duo Bad Meets Evil, "Mirror" with American rapper Lil Wayne, and "Young, Wild & Free" with American hip hop artists Wiz Khalifa and Snoop Dogg. The songs peaked at number four, sixteen, and seven in the U.S. and reached the top-20 of various music charts.

Mars started to promote his debut album as the opening act for American bands Maroon 5 and OneRepublic on the fall leg of the former act's Palm Trees & Power Lines Tour. Later, on October 18, 2010, the singer began a co-headlined European concert tour with McCoy that lasted until early November. Doo-Wops & Hooligans received further promotion when the singer embarked on his first headlined concert tour, The Doo-Wops & Hooligans Tour, which ran from November 2010 to January 2012. Nevertheless, in February 2011, a joint co-headlining tour between Mars and Janelle Monáe was announced, dubbed Hooligans in Wondaland Tour (2011). The concert tour was performed in North America in May and June 2011. Mars turned down offers to open for notable artists on arena tours, opting instead to play at smaller venues, such as theaters and ballrooms. This made the tour less lucrative, but helped him build his fan base.

At the 2011 Grammy Awards, Mars won his first Grammy Award for Best Male Pop Vocal Performance for "Just the Way You Are" and received other six nominations for his work: Best Rap Song, Best Rap/Sung Collaboration and Record of the Year for "Nothin' on You"; the latter category along with Song of the Year for "Fuck You" by CeeLo Green, and Producer of the Year, Non-Classical as part of the Smeezingtons. At the 2012 Grammy Awards, Mars lost all the six categories in which he was nominated to British singer Adele. This included Album of the Year and Best Pop Vocal Album for Doo-Wops & Hooligans, Best Pop Solo Performance, Record and Song of the Year for "Grenade", while Producer of the Year, Non-Classical as the Smeezingtons was lost to English producer Paul Epworth. During this time, Mars also won his first American Music Award for Favorite Pop/Rock Male Artist, International Male Solo Artist at the Brit Awards and the Echo Award for Best International Male.

2012–2014: Unorthodox Jukebox and Super Bowl XLVIII Halftime Show

In March 2012, Mars signed a worldwide publishing deal with BMG Chrysalis US. In September 2012, when interviewed by Billboard magazine, Mars stated that his next album would be more musically varied, adding: "I want to have the freedom and luxury to walk into a studio and say, 'Today I want to do a hip-hop, R&B, soul or rock record'". He announced Unorthodox Jukebox release date, December 11, 2012. The album debuted at number two on the Billboard 200, eventually peaking at number one on the chart. It also charted at number one in Australia, Canada, and in the UK, where it became the third fastest-selling album by a solo artist in 2012. The album has since sold over six million copies worldwide.

"Locked out of Heaven" was released on October 1, 2012, and preceded the release of Unorthodox Jukebox, an album produced mainly by the Smeezingtons. The song topped the U.S. and Canada charts, peaking at number two on the UK. It also charted within the top ten in various countries. Other singles released from the album include "When I Was Your Man", "Treasure", "Gorilla" and "Young Girls". Because "When I Was Your Man" reached number one Billboard Hot 100, aside from Elvis Presley, no other male artist has achieved five number-one singles more quickly than Mars. It also peaked at number three in Canada, number two in the UK, and was top-ten in various countries. "Treasure" reached number five on the Billboard Hot 100 and number four in Canada, but had less commercial success in other countries. Mars contributed vocals to Jamaican-American EDM trio Major Lazer's "Bubble Butt", released in May 2013. The single also features American rappers Tyga, 2 Chainz, and American hip-hop singer Mystic.

Mars ran his second headlining concert tour, the Moonshine Jungle Tour, from June 2013 to October 2014. He also announced a concert residency titled Bruno Mars at The Chelsea, Las Vegas, Paradise, Nevada. The tour grossed $156.4 million. On September 8, 2013, Mars was disclosed as the headline performer at the Super Bowl XLVIII halftime show, which took place on February 2, 2014, with American rock band Red Hot Chili Peppers as special guests. It was the first Super Bowl halftime headlined by a performer under 30 in a decade. It was the most watched halftime show in the history of the Super Bowl at that time, drawing a rating of 115.3 million viewers. The viewership for the halftime show was higher than that for the game.

At the 2014 Grammy Awards, Mars won the award for Best Pop Vocal Album for Unorthodox Jukebox. "Locked Out of Heaven" earned nominations for Record and Song of the Year, while "When I Was Your Man" was nominated for Best Pop Solo Performance. In the same year, the album was recognized with a Juno Award for International Album of the Year. Aside from his music career, Mars cast as Roberto in the movie Rio 2 (2014). He also contributed to the film's soundtrack with the song "Welcome Back". On November 10, 2014, British musician Mark Ronson released "Uptown Funk", featuring Mars. The song was a major commercial success, reaching number one in several countries, including Australia, Canada and New Zealand. "Uptown Funk" spent a total of fourteen and seven weeks atop the Billboard Hot 100 and the UK Singles Chart, respectively. The song became a worldwide phenomenon with a major impact on pop culture.

2015–2018: Super Bowl 50 Halftime performance and 24K Magic 

In September 2014, Mars began working on his third studio album, 24K Magic, affirming, "Now it's time to start writing chapter 3". He had not come up with a date for the release, stating: "Until it's done ... It's gotta be just as good if not better". At the 2016 Grammy Awards "Uptown Funk" won Ronson and Mars a Grammy Award for Best Pop Duo/Group Performance and Record of the Year. On February 7, 2016, British band Coldplay headlined the Super Bowl 50 halftime show with Mars and American singer Beyoncé as guest acts, marking their second appearance on the Super Bowl halftime. It became one of the most watched halftime shows in Super Bowl history. In early 2016, Mars was working with bass player Jamareo Artis, musician Brody Brown, singer-songwriter Andrew Wyatt and EDM producer Skrillex.

24K Magic was set to be issued in March but was postponed several months due to Mars's appearance at the Super Bowl halftime show. At that time, seven songs had already been recorded. They were composed mainly by Shampoo Press & Curl, a production team consisting of Mars, Lawrence, and Brown, which replaced the Smeezingtons. In May 2016, the singer split with his manager because Creed sold half his company. Mars took his business affairs under his own management company, Gorilla Management, operated by Aaron Elharar. At the 2017 Grammy Awards, his work (as part of the Smeezingtons) on Adele's "All I Ask", a track from her third studio album, 25 (2015), brought him a Grammy Award for Album of the Year. In 2017, Guinness World Records recognized Mars as the "First Male Artist to achieve three 10-million-selling-singles".

In October 2016, "24K Magic" was released as the lead single of 24K Magic. It peaked at number four in the U.S. and reached the top in France and New Zealand. The album, issued on November 18, 2016, debuted at number two in Canada, France, New Zealand, and the U.S. It has since sold over five million copies globally. Four more singles were released throughout 2017 and 2018: "That's What I Like", "Versace on the Floor", "Chunky", exclusively released in Australia, and a remix of "Finesse" featuring American rapper Cardi B. "That's What I Like" was the album's highest-charting single on the Billboard Hot 100, peaking at number one, while "Finesse" reached the top-three. Both singles reached number three in Canada, number four and two in New Zealand, respectively. All appeared on Billboards Hot R&B/Hip-Hop Songs, with "That's What I Like" and "Finesse" reaching number one.

In late 2016, the singer started his second concert residency titled Bruno Mars at Park MGM. He also announced his third headlining concert tour, 24K Magic World Tour, which began in March 2017 and ended in December 2018. The tour grossed more than $300 million worldwide. On November 29, 2017, CBS aired Mars's first TV concert special, Bruno Mars: 24K Magic Live at the Apollo. He received seven awards at the 2017 American Music Awards, including Artist of the Year, two for "That's What I Like" and other two for 24K Magic. He also won Album/Mixtape of the Year at the 2017 Soul Train Music Awards, in addition to four other awards. At the 2018 Grammy Awards, Mars won in the six categories for which he was nominated: Album of the Year and Best R&B Album for 24K Magic, Record of the Year for the title track and Song of The Year, Best R&B Performance and Best R&B Song for "That's What I Like". 24K Magic also won a Grammy Award for Best Engineered Album, Non-Classical, for the work of the album's engineers.

2018–2022: Further collaborations and An Evening with Silk Sonic
Mars worked on Chic's studio album It's About Time (2018), with the song expected to be featured on Chic's next studio album, according to musician Nile Rodgers. In early 2018, Mars worked with recording engineer Charles Moniz, as well as songwriting and recording production team the Stereotypes. In September 2018, Mars and American rappers Gucci Mane and Kodak Black  released "Wake Up in the Sky" for Mane's thirteenth studio album, Evil Genius (2018). It reached number 11 in the US. In February 2019, Cardi B and Mars released a single together, "Please Me". It peaked at number three on the Billboard Hot 100. The single also reached the top-20 of Canada, New Zealand and the UK. Five months later, British singer-songwriter Ed Sheeran, American singer-songwriter Chris Stapleton, and Mars collaborated on, "Blow", for the former's fourth studio album, No.6 Collaborations Project (2019). In October 2019, Mars posted a picture of himself in a recording studio, possibly indicating new music.

In February 2020, it was announced a partnership between Mars and Disney for a "music-themed theatrical narrative", in which the singer will both star and produce the movie. A month later, it was confirmed that Mars was working on his next album, possibly with American musician Babyface. While on quarantine, the singer wrote music every day for his upcoming album. In the same year, Mars sold part of his song catalog to Warner Chappell Music, keeping a small share. In exchange for its payment to Mars, Warner Chappell Music, a subsidiary of the Warner Music Group, will collect future income from the songs. Mars's co-publishing contract with BMG was also a part of the deal. In 2021, Mars was reportedly paid $3.2 million to perform at a private show in Cape Cod, Massachusetts. The performance was delivered to Motorola CEO son's wedding.

On February 26, 2021, Mars and American rapper Anderson .Paak announced that they have recorded an album together under the band name Silk Sonic. Their debut album, An Evening with Silk Sonic, was released on November 12, 2021, and it features American musician Bootsy Collins as a special guest host. It debuted at number two on the Billboard 200 and entered at the top-five in Australia, Canada, and New Zealand. The songs "Leave the Door Open", "Skate, "Smokin out the Window", a cover version of Con Funk Shun's "Love's Train" and "After Last Night" featuring Thundercat and Bootsy Collins were released as singles. "Leave the Door Open" peaked at number one on the Billboard Hot 100 and in New Zealand. "Smokin out the Window" peaked at number five on the Billboard Hot 100 and number four in New Zealand. All the singles, but "Skate", topped the Billboard Adult R&B Songs, which led the album to become the second with four number-one singles on the aforementioned chart, tying Toni Braxton's record.

In early 2022, Silk Sonic started their debut concert residency titled An Evening with Silk Sonic at Park MGM. The duo won Best Group at the BET Awards 2021, International Group of the Year at the 2022 Brit Awards and Outstanding Duo, Group or Collaboration, Traditional at the 53rd NAACP Image Awards. They received three awards at the 2021 Soul Train Music Awards, including Song of the Year for "Leave the Door Open". At the 2022 Grammy Awards, Silk Sonic won Record of the Year, Song of The Year, Best R&B Performance and Best R&B Song for the latter song. At the BET Awards 2022 Silk Sonic won Album of the Year for their debut album and Video of the Year. The same music video also won Video of the Year at the 2022 Soul Train Music Awards.

2023–present: Fourth studio album
In February 2023, Mars began working on his fourth solo studio album. He told Brody Brown to join him in the studio, saying, "Man, I'm working on my fourth album. Let's get it. Let's hurry up and go."

Artistry

Influences

Mars was raised on his father's 1950s doo-wop collection – "simple four-chord songs that got straight to the point" – and on Little Richard, Frankie Lymon, Little Anthony, and Jerry Lee Lewis. As a child, Mars spent time impersonating Elvis Presley. This playacting had a major impact on his musical evolution; he later reflected:  He also impersonated Michael Jackson, another major inspiration. The hip-hop productions by The Neptunes and Timbaland, that were played on the radio, also influenced him.

Mars's musical style gravitated initially towards R&B. He was influenced by artists such as Keith Sweat, Jodeci, and R. Kelly. As a child he also took notice of Jimmy Jam and Terry Lewis, New Edition, Bobby Brown, Boyz II Men, Teddy Riley and Babyface. At the same time, he also listened to 1950s rock 'n' roll, doo-wop music, and Motown. In high school, he listened to classic rock groups such as Led Zeppelin, and The Beatles, whose influences can be heard in his work, as well as singers with high voices, like Stevie Wonder and Freddie Mercury. Bob Marley, and local bands in Hawaii, were a major influence and account for his reggae roots. Hip-hop acts like Jay-Z, The Roots, and Cody Chesnutt were among some of his favourites, and have influenced his compositions. Each of these musical genres has influenced the singer's musical style; he observed: "It's not easy to [create] songs with that mixture of rock and soul and hip-hop, and there's only a handful of them." Mars also admires classical music.

Other artists Mars has said inspired his work include Janet Jackson, Jimi Hendrix, Amy Winehouse, Sly Stone, Carlos Santana, George Clinton, and Usher. Mars has also stated that he is a fan of Alicia Keys, Jessie J, Jack White, The Saturdays, and Kings of Leon.

Musical style and themes
Mars's music has been noted for displaying a wide variety of styles, musical genres, and influences, including pop, R&B, funk, soul, reggae, and rock. His debut album, Doo-Wops & Hooligans, is predominantly a pop, reggae pop and R&B record. It is influenced by most of the genres mentioned above. Many of his songs on the album, reflect "feel-good", carefree, and optimistic sentiments. However, darker subjects are addressed in his songs, detailing failed relationships, pain and loneliness. His subsequent release, Unorthodox Jukebox, as with his debut album, is infused with different influences including disco, funk, rock, reggae and soul, as well as balladry. Lyrically, the album is different from the former, addressing traditional notions of romance, male chauvinism, and sexuality. The explicit content in the song "Gorilla" caused a controversy in Australia. Mars's third album, 24K Magic, was significantly influenced by R&B, funk, pop and new jack swing. Lyrically, the album involves themes of money and sex. An Evening with Silk Sonic is the debut studio album by American musical superduo Silk Sonic, composed of Mars and Anderson .Paak. The album is rooted in R&B, soul, funk, hip hop and pop music. It explores themes of "seduction, romance", reconciliation, materialism and features explicit lyrics.

Voice
Mars possesses a three-octave tenor vocal range. Jon Caramanica of The New York Times commented that he is one of the most "versatile and accessible singers in pop, with a light, soul-influenced voice that's an easy fit in a range of styles, a universal donor", while Tim Sendra from AllMusic described the singer's vocals on Doo-Wops & Hooligans as "the kind of smooth instrument that slips into your ear like honey." Jody Rosen from Rolling Stone called Mars a "nimble, soulful vocalist" on Unorthodox Jukebox. Jim Farber of the New York Daily News likened the voice "the purity, cream and range of mid-period Michael Jackson" in a review of a concert promoting Unorthodox Jukebox. On 24K Magic, Consequence of Sounds Karen Gwen afirmed that Mars showed his "pips" and pushed his vocals to the limit. She described his voice as a "clear, unapologetic tenor" being a "blessing" nowadays. Jon Caramanica of The New York Times found 24K Magic to show the singer's vocal ability from tenderness to "the more forceful side of his voice".

Songwriting
Mars has explained his writing process: "I don't sit down and think, 'I'm going to write a song'", since "You can't force creativeness" as inspiration comes out of the blue in different places. Ideas occur suddenly to him; and occasionally, he is able to materialize them into lyrics. He has stated that he typically writes songs by playing the guitar or piano first. Mars is also able to play drums, guitar, keyboard, bass, piano, ukulele and congas. Mars usually plays the instrumentation or part of it, on his albums and on the songs he composes for other artists.

Mars claims that his work with other artists has influenced his musical style: "Nothin' on You had a Motown vibe, Billionaire was a reggae acoustic guitar-driven song, though one of my favorites is the CeeLo Green song. I don't think anyone else could've sung that song. And there's Just the Way You Are. If you know my story, you know I love all different genres of music." Mars states that growing up in Hawaii influenced his style, giving the songs a reggae sound. He explains: "In Hawaii some of the biggest radio stations are reggae. That music brings people together. It's not urban music or pop music. It's just songs. That's what makes it cross over so well. The song comes first."

Philip Lawrence, one of his music partners, stated: "What people don't know is there's a darker underbelly to Bruno Mars." Nevertheless, most of his music is romantic and Mars himself says: "I blame that on me singing to girls back in high school". Brody Brown, who has worked various times with Mars, affirmed that the latter is in charge of both the melody and lyrics of his tracks, "I'll just do the music, but Bruno does both. I chime in on some things with words, but the majority of the content is written by Bruno and Phil (Lawrence)."

Showmanship

Mars is known for his retro showmanship, which is widely acclaimed by tour critics and reviewers. Deanna Ramsay of The Jakarta Post described Mars as a "truly global star". Boston Heralds Jim Sullivan compared the showmanship of Mars to Michael Jackson and Elvis Presley. Kevin Johnson of the St. Louis Post-Dispatch called Mars a "consummate performer." The Boston Globe Sarah Rodman said that Mars shows an "indefatigable ecstatic approach to performing" and "classic showmanship." In the same vein, Jim Farber of the Daily News stated of the halftime show at Super Bowl XLVIII that Mars "brings old-school showmanship to dynamic performance." The singer took its inspiration by playing videotapes of Elvis, James Brown and Michael Jackson when he was younger. Nowadays, before the shows, he watches Brown's T.A.M.I. Show, James Hendrix's Live at Woodstock or Prince performing "Purple Rain" (1984).

During The Doo-Wops & Hooligans Tour, Ara Jansan from The West Australian called the performance "one of the most creative and exciting displays of musical artistry" she had witnessed in a long time and noticed the concert attracted a wide-ranging audience of all age groups. The Oregonians Robert Ham noticed, on the Hooligans in Wondaland Tour, that the singer not only grabbed the spectators' attention throughout the entire concert, but he also sang every note by himself with noticeable guitar skills. During the Moonshine Jungle Tour, Jason Lipshutz of Billboard described the singer's performance as "entertaining ... keeping smiles plastered on the faces of his onlookers, and he does a better job at it than almost anyone working in music right now". Rolling Stone magazine placed Mars at number 35 on its list of 50 Best Live Acts Right Now in 2013; "Anyone from the age of 5 to 95 can walk out of a Bruno Mars concert feeling like the show was designed just for them. Mars walks the old-school walk and talks the sexy talk, but he also nails the hits, leads a super-energetic nine-piece soul band, and rips a mean drum solo". NFL executives Sarah Moll and Tracy Perlman stated that: "If you go to his concerts, it's 11-year-old girls to 65-year-old women—it's everyone", after seeing The Moonshine Jungle tour several times during the summer of 2013. The 24K Magic World Tour, was praised by critics due to the showmanship, guitar skills and stage production. The tour won two Pollstar awards, two Billboard Music Awards and one TEC Award. Mars's concert residency, Bruno Mars at Park MGM, won Top R&B Tour at the 2022 Billboard Music Awards.

Mars's concerts feature The Hooligans, a band that includes a guitarist, bassist, drummer, keyboardist, and a horn section. They also serve as dancers and background singers. Critics noted the difference the backup band and the arrangements made to the sound of the live versions of the songs compared to those on the album. The shows feature all-band choreographed dancing arrangements, including footwork inspired by James Brown and the splits. The shows are influenced by the disco era with a soul revue-inspired set. In addition, long, mellow, and soft interludes that echo the smooth contemporary R&B style which was popular during the 1990s are also part of the show. The set lists blend several genres of music, including pop, doo-wop, funk, R&B, soul and reggae. His shows usually feature pyrotechnics, strobe and laser lighting, and he typically plays the drums and guitar. In 2021, Pollstar named Mars the hip-hop/R&B touring artist of the 2010s decade.

Music videos
Mars has collaborated with many different directors to produce his music videos, and over time he emerged as a music video director. From 2010 to 2017, Mars co-directed with Cameron Duddy ten music videos from his albums Doo-Wops & Hooligans, Unorthodox Jukebox, and 24K Magic, as well as featured singles. In 2011, not only Mars developed the second concept and treatment for "The Lazy Song", but he also brought in Duddy to co-directed the music video with him. In an interview, Duddy elaborated that he and Mars "can fight like sisters when it comes to doing music videos. The best collaborations are always fueled by opposite perspectives or alternative ideas. We always find a common ground." In 2018, Mars co-directed the music video for "Finesse" with Florent Dechard. He continued to collaborate with Dechard on the music videos for "Please Me", "Blow", "Leave the Door Open" and "Skate".

Mars, who choreographed the video for "Treasure", won the award for Best Choreography at the 2013 MTV Video Music Awards. Mars and Duddy work was recognized at several award shows, including two nominations for an MTV Video Music Award for Best Direction on "Uptown Funk" and "24K Magic". Mars collaborations with Dechard earned them a nomination for Video Director of the Year at the 2019 BET Hip Hop Awards. In 2017, "That's What I Like" directed by Mars and Jonathan Lia led both to a nomination at the BET Awards 2017 for Video Director of the Year. In 2018, Mars and Ben Winston's direction of Bruno Mars: 24K Magic Live at the Apollo (2017) earned them a nomination for a Primetime Emmy Award for Outstanding Music Direction. In 2021, Mars and Dechard directed the video for "Leave the Door Open", for which they won Video Director of the Year at the BET Awards 2021. The afformentioned music video also won Best Editing at the 2021 MTV Video Music Awards.

Aesthetic
Mars not only wears outfits inspired by previous decades, but he also matches that aesthetic to his music. On his debut studio album, Doo-Wops and Hooligans, the singer wore '60s-inspired suits and presented faded hair. However, on his third studio album, 24K Magic, Mars was channeling the '80s and '90s in its sound and aesthetic. During the recording process of 24K Magic, Mars imposed a dress code in the studio, favoring jewelry and "fine clothes" over sweatpants to create "groovy, smooth and soulful songs". In 2021, he collaborated with Anderson .Paak on their supergroup, Silk Sonic, to release their debut studio album, An Evening with Silk Sonic. Mars wore "wide collars, leisure suits, and funky patterns", as was usual in the '70s, which was also paired with their sound. Tessa Petak writing for InStyle affirmed, "Regardless of the decade he's emulating, Mars's fashion sense and stage presence make him larger-than-life".

The Hooligans – Band members
Current members
 Bruno Mars – lead vocals, rhythm guitar (2010–present)
 Philip Lawrence – backing vocals (2010–2018, 2022–present)
 Phredley Brown – keyboard, rhythm guitar (2010–2012), lead guitar (2012–present), backing vocals (2010–present)
 Jamareo Artis – bass guitar (2010–present)
 Eric Hernandez – drums (2010–present)
 Kameron Whalum – trombone (2010–present), backing vocals (2018–present)
 Dwayne Dugger – saxophone (2010–present)
 James King – trumpet (2010–present), backing vocals (2018–present)
 John Fossit – keyboard (2012–present)

Former members
 Kenji Chan – lead guitar (2010–2012)
 Mateus Asato – rhythm guitar (2019), (2021)

Silk Sonic members
 All The Hooligans (excluding Phredley Brown) – same instruments (2022–present)
 Maurice "Mobetta" Brown – trumpet (2022)
 Mateus Asato – lead guitar (2022–present)
 Anderson .Paak – vocals and drums (2021–present)
 
Timeline

Other ventures

Endorsements and partnerships
In 2011, Mars appeared in two commercials for Bench. He and model Joan Smalls were photographed in 1950s influenced suits in Puerto Rico as part of the clothing line "La Isla Bonita" for Vogue. In 2012, Mars decided to invest in Chromatik, which makes digital versions of sheet music for the web and iPad. Mars said: "I love that Chromatik will bring better music education into schools. [...] And I'm happy to be a part of it." In 2013, Mars tweeted a picture of himself using an electronic cigarette. A press release was published reporting his investment in the NJOY Electronic Cigarette Company, "in order to quit smoking for his mother", as the singer "believes in the product and the company's mission."

In 2014, the small rum brand SelvaRey Rum began catering events and parties by Mars. In the following year, the singer was introduced to the brand by co-founder Seth Gold. At that point, Mars decided to invest an undisclosed amount for an equity stake in SelvaRey. In 2020, Mars decided to go global, after he and Gold tried multiple combinations with the bottles and flavors for years, the singer was responsible for the new taste, branding, and design of the packaging, with a 1970s style. The brand was founded and is co-owned by Mars, Seth Gold, Marc Gold, and Robert Herzig. Later, The Hooligans, along with Anderson .Paak, American record producer and songwriter D'Mile, American singer-songwriter James Fauntleroy, and Charles Moniz also became co-owners.

On March 5, 2021, Mars, under his designer alter ego, Ricky Regal, released a luxury 1970s-inspired sportswear with Lacoste, entitled Lacoste x Ricky Regal. He worked with Louise Trotter, Lacoste's creative director, in order to create a clothing line that matched his personality with Lacoste's sportswear. According to Trotter, the singer was involved with every aspect of the collection from concept to fittings. When they started to work on the design process, Mars adopted "an alter ego to help him think as a designer." On July 29, 2022, it was reported that Mars is set to open a lounge bar on the Las Vegas Strip, replacing the Lily Bar & Lounge at the Bellagio. It will be named "The Pinky Ring", a reference to a lyric from his song "24K Magic" (2016).

Philanthropy
In 2014, it was announced that Mars had partnered with the Hawai'i Community Foundation and the Grammy Foundation to establish a Grammy Camp Scholarship Fund for qualified needs-based applicants from Hawaii. On September 27, 2017, he expanded his camp scholarship in order to include applicants from all over the United States. The singer established the partnership in honor of his mother.

In 2014, Mars donated US$100,000 to the orphans of Bantay Bata, who were among the victims of Typhoon Haiyan, in order to raise the morale of those who lost their families and homes. The singer performed at the Make It Right gala, whose campaign goal is to "help build homes for people in need." He also performed at the Robin Hood Foundation's 2014 annual benefit to "fight poverty in New York City by supporting nonprofit organizations with financial and technical assistance." In 2017, Mars and Live Nation donated 1 million dollars from the show at the Palace in Auburn Hills, Michigan, to help the victims of the Flint water crisis. The singer participated in the "Somos Una Voz" relief initiative to help survivors of Hurricane Maria in Puerto Rico and Mexico's earthquake.

In November 2018, Mars donated 24,000 meals in aid to the Salvation Army Hawaiian & Pacific Islands Division's 48th annual Thanksgiving Dinner. In 2020, he donated $1 million to the MGM Resorts Foundation, in order to assist MGM employees with financial difficulties due to the COVID-19 pandemic. In the same year, Mars and other artists donated autographed or unique microphones to Reverb.com, a music gear online marketplace, for a charity sale "with all proceeds going to ten youth music education programs" affected by the COVID-19 pandemic. He also created a protest placard with an Angela Davis quote for an online auction called Show Me the Signs to help families of black women killed by police.

Until the end of 2021, Mars donated all the profits earned with SelvaRey Rum to the Honolulu Community College's Music & Entertainment Learning Experience program, in Hawaii. In the same year, the singer was part of the "Keep Memory Alive Power of Love" gala. The event's proceeds support services, care, and resources to patients and their caregivers to combat neurocognitive diseases. In 2022, Mars alongside Billie Eilish, Dua Lipa, Shawn Mendes, and Rosalía were named co-chairs for the "Grammy Museum's Campaign for Music Education". The aim is to raise between 3-$5 million for the Grammy's educational programs. This will allow people, who are 18 and under as well as college students, free entrance to the Los Angeles Grammy Museum and access to various "music education programs" in the US.

Impact
Bruno Mars has been cited as a "pop icon" by media outlets such as The Philippine Star, Courier & Press, The Dickinson Press, and iHeartRadio. The Guardian writer Michael Cragg deemed "the Bruno Mars strategy" the career path of "songwriter turned popstar", as he became known within the music industry by writing and producing hit singles for other artists, and eventually appearing as a featured artist on them—with The New Yorker stating that he overshadowed the lead artists on those songs. Amanda Petrusich of The New Yorker described him as "arguably one of the most instinctive and enthralling showmen of his generation". Fuse TV website has credited Mars for bringing the "funkalicious vibes" of retro pop and R&B back to modern music, while The Independent writer Roisin O'connor has cited him as the "king of retro crooning". In 2013, NPR Music writer Ann Powers defined Mars as "the most valuable pop historian" at the time. In 2016, Damien Scott writing for BET called Mars "the prince of pop music". In 2019, Margaret Farrell from Stereogum affirmed that "Uptown Funk"s success "solidified Mars' kingly pop stature."

Billboard has expressed that no male artist in contemporary pop music during the 2010s has enjoyed a longer success streak than Mars. Similarly, Slate considered him "the most consistent male pop star of the 2010s". In 2021, WBLS stated that Mars "has been a dominant force in popular culture for more than a decade". In 2023, The Times ranked Mars as the thirteenth best vocalist of the 21st century among 20. The New York Times and Toronto Star have described "Uptown Funk" as one of the most recognizable pop songs of the century. Speaking on his Puerto Rican roots and ethnic labels, Remezcla website argued that Mars is "the first proud Latino artist to make it" to the "top of international pop culture" while not following the music industry's "cynical labels game" to be pigeonholed. Singers such as AJ Mitchell, Thomas Rhett, Dua Lipa, Benny Dayal, Rauw Alejandro, KiDi, Lee Brice, Shawn Mendes, Selena Gomez, and Meghan Trainor have cited his music and showmanship as an inspiration.

In 2013, Mars was named Artist of the Year by Billboard, while in 2016 he became the recipient of NRJ Artist of Honor "in special recognition for his contribution to music". The singer earned an Innovator Award at the 2017 iHeartRadio Music Awards and a Visionary Award at the 2017 Teen Choice Awards. In 2019, iHeartRadio Canada placed Mars on theirs "Icons of the Decade" of the 2010s, while Insider gave him an honorable mention on their 2010s list. In 2021, Billboard named Mars the third Top Artist of the 2010s and ranked him at number 14 on the list of Top Touring Artists of the 2010s.

Awards and achievements

Mars has earned numerous awards and honors throughout his career, including 15 Grammy Awards, four Brit Awards, four Guinness World Record 11 American and 14 Soul Train Music Awards. In 2011, he made Time magazine's 100 list and his former songwriting and record producing team, the Smeezingtons, earned several accolades. In 2014, Mars topped Forbes magazine's '30 Under 30' list, a tally of the brightest stars in 15 different fields under the age of 30 in the US. At the 2018 Grammys, he became the second artist to win Record and Song of the Year with two different songs from the same album. At the 2022 Grammys, Mars became the second artist to win Record of the Year three times. In 2019, Billboard ranked Mars at number 41 on its list of Greatest of All Time Artists. As a songwriter, Mars has been honored, as part of the Smeezingtons, by Music Week as best songwriters of 2010 and by Billboard as he ranked at number six on their 2013 list of Hot 100 Songwriters.

"Just The Way You Are" holds the record as the longest-reigning debut on adult contemporary, spending twenty weeks atop the Adult Contemporary chart in the U.S. "When I Was Your Man" became the second number one song in the U.S. to feature only piano and vocals. He is the first male artist to place two titles as a lead act in the U.S. top 10 simultaneously. In total, he has eight number-one singles in the U.S. In 2018, he matched Beyonce and Mariah Carey as the only artists with three top-five singles in the U.S. from their first three studio albums. In the same year, he became the first solo male artist with nine number ones in the U.S. Mainstream Top 40 chart. Mars, Sheeran and Jewel are the only artists with two songs to spend at least half a year in the U.S. top 10. In 2019, Mars was one of the few artists who have spent at least 241 weeks among all their U.S. Billboard Hot 100 top 10s. "Uptown Funk" and "Grenade" were listed by several publications as being among the best songs of the decade.

According to the International Federation of the Phonographic Industry (IFPI), "Just the Way You Are" and "Grenade" are two of the most successful digital singles of all time, with sales of 12.5 million and 10.2 million, respectively. This contributed to Mars becoming the biggest selling artist of 2012. His songs "Just The Way You Are", "Grenade", "Locked Out Of Heaven", and "When I Was Your Man" have each sold over 4 million digital copies, making him the first male artist to do so as a lead singer. Six of his singles are counted among the best-selling singles of all time. Worldwide, Mars has sold 26 million albums as of 2016, and a total of 200 million singles as of 2020. In 2022, he became the first artist to receive six diamond certified songs in the United States.

Due to the ticket reselling that occurred during the week after the performance of Mars at the Super Bowl, and in order to limit that kind of profiteering, Hawaii Senate President Donna Mercado Kim introduced Senate Resolution 12, also known as the Bruno Mars Act. It limits all ticket purchases within 48 hours of the on-sale date to the physical box office. This ensures that anyone who comes to the box office to buy tickets for a show should almost certainly be guaranteed a ticket and discourages ticket scalping. The State Senate in Hawaii passed the law. However, the bill died at the conference committee. As of September 2021, Billboard reported that Mars has earned $604.4 million from concerts. He is one of fewer than 30 artists to cross the $600 million threshold in Boxscore history. In 2022, Mars became the fastest-selling artist for his five shows in Japan, selling approximately 210.000 tickets in record time.

Personal life

Family and relationships
Eric Hernandez, Mars's brother, has continuously served as the drummer for his backup band, The Hooligans. Their sisters, Tiara, Tahiti, and Presley, as well as their cousin Jamie, make up the all-girl music group The Lylas. When she was young, Jamie moved in with the siblings due to parental issues. Mars began dating model Jessica Caban in 2011. The two remain a couple , residing together in a mansion in the Hollywood Hills with a Rottweiler named Geronimo.

On May 31, 2013, Mars was returning to Los Angeles from an overseas gig when he learned in the airport that his mother was gravely ill. He immediately got on a plane to Hawaii. The following day, his mother died at Queens Medical Center in Honolulu, aged 55, from complications of a brain aneurysm. On June 7, 2013, the singer wrote about the loss of his mother on Twitter: "So thankful for all the love during the most difficult time in my life. I'll be back on my feet again soon. That's what mom wants, she told me."

Race
In 2013, Mars told Rolling Stone that record executives "had trouble categorizing him", and were consequently unsure which radio stations would play his songs, or to which ethnic group (black or white) he would appeal. In the same month, he confessed that "Nothin' on You" was rejected by a "music industry decision-maker" because of his race. That experience made him feel like a "mutant", and he says that was his lowest point. "Even with that song in my back pocket to seal the deal, things like that are coming out of people's mouths. It made me feel like I wasn't even in the room."

In 2018, Mars was accused during The Grapevine, a series that explores African-American issues, of cultural appropriation on social media for using his racial ambiguity to profit from black music, and was criticized for mimicking the sound of past artists. Various black celebrities, including Stevie Wonder, Charlie Wilson, 9th Wonder, Marjua Estevez, and Stereo Williams dismissed the accusations. Mars has spoken often about his influences and has given credit to several black artists, such as Babyface, Teddy Riley, and Jimmy Jam & Terry Lewis. In 2021, during an interview on The Breakfast Club, Mars responded to the criticism, "The only reason why I'm here is because of James Brown, is because of Prince, Michael [Jackson]...that's it. This music comes from love and if you can't hear that, then I don't know what to tell you."

Legal issues
On September 19, 2010, Mars was arrested in Las Vegas, Nevada, at the Hard Rock Casino for possession of cocaine. While talking to a police officer, Mars reportedly declared that what he did was "foolish" and that "he has never used drugs before." Mars pleaded guilty to felony drug possession and in return was told that the charges would be erased from his criminal record as long as he stayed out of trouble for a year. He paid a $2,000 fine, did 200 hours of community service, and completed a drug counseling course. Nevertheless, in a cover story for GQ magazine in 2013, Mars said: "I was young, man! I was in fucking Vegas ... I wasn't thinking". He added: "I was given a number one record and I'm out doing dumb shit." Mars confessed that he lied to the authorities about having done cocaine before, saying "I don't know where that came from", adding: "I was really intoxicated. I was really drunk. So a lot of that is a big blur, and I try every day to forget."

On January 28, 2014, Demetrius Orlandus Proctor filed a lawsuit, claiming he holds the copyright for the McCoy and Mars track "Billionaire". Proctor claimed he owned the copyright to the music and lyrics of the track since March 31, 2011, though the song was released a year before. As evidence, Proctor has submitted a United States Copyright Office registration certificate for "Frisky Vol. 1 to 30 (Tapes)", issued in 2000. Proctor accused McCoy and Mars of "willful and intentional" infringement of copyright, seeking the destruction of all copies of the recording. Proctor claims he has exclusive rights to reproduce and distribute the song.

"Uptown Funk" by Ronson and Mars has received various accusations and lawsuits over copyright infringement. In 2015, similarities with "Oops Up Side Your Head" (1979) by The Gap Band led them, along with keyboardist Rudolph Taylor, and producer Lonnie Simmons to be added as co-writers of "Uptown Funk" and receive publishing royalties. In the same year, Serbian artist Viktorija argued that "Uptown Funk" infringed on one of her tracks. She decided not to sue Mars and Ronson. In 2016, electro-funk band Collage sued Ronson and Mars for copying their single, "Young Girls" (1983), while The Sequence, a rap group, claimed it infringed their single "Funk You Up" (1979) and sued a year later. In 2017, Lastrada Entertainment filed a lawsuit due to similarities with "More Bounce to the Ounce" (1980) by Zapp. The company seeks damage, a jury trial and prevent Ronson from profiting with "Uptown Funk". In 2018, the Collage and Zapp lawsuits were dropped, it was not revealed if there had been any financial settlement.

"Treasure" was re-registered with new writing credits, which included Thibaut Berland and Christopher Khan, due to the similarities with Breakbot's "Baby I'm Yours".

Wealth
Billboard estimated Mars's earnings at $18,839,681, making him the twelfth highest paid musician of 2013. Forbes magazine began reporting his earnings in 2014, calculating that the $60 million earned between June 2013 to June 2014, for his music and tour, made him thirteenth on the list of the Celebrity 100 list. In June 2017, Mars ranked sixth on the Forbes World's Highest Paid Celebrities, earning an estimated $39 million from June 2016 through June 2017. In July 2018, Forbes announced that Mars was America's highest-paid musician of 2017, with an estimated total of $100 million. This, in turn, placed him at number 11 on the Celebrity 100 list as well as being his highest yearly earnings to date. In 2019, he was placed at number 54 on the Forbes Celebrity 100 list, with estimated earnings of $51.5 million between June 1, 2018, and June 1, 2019.

Discography

Studio albums
 Doo-Wops & Hooligans (2010)
 Unorthodox Jukebox (2012)
 24K Magic (2016)

Collaborative albums
 An Evening with Silk Sonic (with Anderson .Paak, as Silk Sonic) (2021)

Filmography

 Honeymoon in Vegas (1992)
 Rio 2 (2014)

Tours and residencies

Concert tours
Headlining
 The Doo-Wops & Hooligans Tour (2010–2012)
 Moonshine Jungle Tour (2013–2014)
 24K Magic World Tour (2017–2018)

Co-headlining
 European tour with Travie McCoy (2010) 
 Hooligans in Wondaland Tour with Janelle Monáe (2011)

Opening act
 Palm Trees & Power Lines Tour  (2010)

Concert residencies
 Bruno Mars at The Chelsea, Las Vegas (2013–2015)
 Bruno Mars at Park MGM (2016–2023)
 An Evening with Silk Sonic at Park MGM (2022)

See also

 List of best-selling singles in the United States
 List of Billboard Hot 100 chart achievements and milestones
 List of highest-certified music artists in the United States
 List of highest-grossing concert tours
 List of most-followed Twitter accounts

References

External links

 
 
 

 
1985 births
21st-century American male singers
21st-century multi-instrumentalists
American contemporary R&B singers
American funk singers
American hip hop singers
American male dancers
American male singer-songwriters
American music video directors
American musicians of Filipino descent
American musicians of Puerto Rican descent
Hispanic and Latino American musicians
Hispanic and Latino American singers
American male actors of Filipino descent
American male pop singers
Record producers from California
American reggae musicians
American soul singers
American tenors
APRA Award winners
Atlantic Records artists
Brit Award winners
Elektra Records artists
Elvis impersonators
Grammy Award winners
Living people
Musicians from Honolulu
President Theodore Roosevelt High School alumni
Reggae fusion artists
Singers from Los Angeles
Singers with a three-octave vocal range
Writers from Honolulu
Juno Award for International Album of the Year winners
Jewish singers
Jewish American songwriters
MTV Europe Music Award winners
Hawaii people of Puerto Rican descent
Silk Sonic members
Singer-songwriters from California
Singer-songwriters from Hawaii
BT Digital Music Awards winners